Leonardo Damian Celiz (born 26 January 1983) is an Argentine footballer midfielder. He currently plays for Deportivo Coreano in Torneo Argentino B.

External links
 BDFA profile

1983 births
Living people
Argentine footballers
Association football midfielders
Racing Club de Avellaneda footballers
FBC Melgar footballers
C.A. Bella Vista players
Expatriate footballers in Peru
Expatriate footballers in Uruguay
People from La Matanza Partido
Sportspeople from Buenos Aires Province